The Order of Wheel of the Thunder Dragon (Dzongkha : Druk Khorlo) is a Single Class Order ranking fourth in the Order of Precedence. It was instituted by King Jigme Dorji Wangchuck on 9 February 1967 an reorganized by King Jigme Khesar Namgyel Wangchuck in January 2008 and consists of a neck Badge and a matching miniature.

Insignia 

The 65 mm badge, comprises a back plate of dorjee the point of which form an outer circle, within which a black enamelled circle encloses the King's portrait in gold, on a background of enameled yellow and orange of the Bhutanese National Flag.

The ribbon is blue with orange and yellow stripes on the edges.

References 

 Medals of the world, Bhutanese decorations

Orders, decorations, and medals of Bhutan
Awards established in 2008